Athletic 220 FC  was a Mongolian professional football club based in Ulaanbaatar, that competed in the Mongolian Premier League. The club was established in 2016, and was promoted to the Mongolian Premier League after emerging runners-up in the Mongolia 1st League the same year. In August 2022 it was announced that, despite a string of success including two appearances in the AFC Cup, the club had withdrawn from the Mongolian Premier League because of financial difficulties.

History

Domestic

Continental record

Current squad
As of 16 July 2022

References

External links
MFF profile
Soccerway profile
Official Facebook

Football clubs in Mongolia
Association football clubs established in 2016
2016 establishments in Mongolia